The 2011–12 Segunda División B season is the 35th since its establishment. The first matches of the season were played on 20 August 2011, and the season ended on 24 June 2012 with the promotion play-off finals.

Group 1
 Teams from Asturias, Canary Islands, Castile-La Mancha, Community of Madrid and Galicia.

Summary before 2011–12 season 
 Playoffs de Ascenso:
 CD Lugo
 CD Guadalajara (P)
 Real Madrid Castilla
 CD Leganés

 Promoted to This Group From Tercera División:
 CD Toledo
 Marino de Luanco
 La Roda CF
 S.S. Reyes

 Relegated to This Group From Segunda División:
 Albacete
 CD Tenerife

 Relegated to Tercera División:
 Universidad LPGC
 Deportivo B
 Pontevedra
 Extremadura
 Cerro Reyes

Stadia and locations

League table

Results

Top goalscorers
Last updated 13 May 2012

Top goalkeepers
Last updated 13 May 2012

Group 2
 Teams from Basque Country, Cantabria, Castile and León, La Rioja and Navarre.

Summary before 2011–12 season 
 Playoffs de Ascenso:
 SD Eibar
 CD Mirandés
 Deportivo Alavés
 Real Unión

 Promoted to This Group From Tercera División:
 Burgos CF
 SD Amorebieta
 Arandina CF
 Sestao River Club
 Gimnástica Segoviana CF

 Relegated to This Group From Segunda División:
 SD Ponferradina
 UD Salamanca

 Relegated to Tercera División:
 Cultural Leonesa
 Caudal Deportivo
 CD La Muela
 Peña Sport FC
 Barakaldo CF

Stadia and locations

League table

Results

Top goalscorers
Last updated 13 May 2012

Top goalkeepers
Last updated 13 May 2012

Group 3
 Teams from Aragon, Balearic Islands, Catalonia and Valencian Community.

Summary before 2011–12 season 
 Playoffs de Ascenso:
 CE Sabadell FC (P)
 CF Badalona
 CD Alcoyano (P)
 Orihuela CF

 Promoted to This Group From Tercera División:
 UE Llagostera
 Andorra CF
 Valencia Mestalla
 CD Manacor
 CF Reus Deportiu
 CD Olímpic de Xàtiva
 Huracán Valencia

 Relegated to This Group From Segunda División:
 None

 Relegated to Tercera División:
 Alicante CF
 CD Castellón
 Benidorm CF
 UD Alzira
 UDA Gramenet
 FC Santboià

Stadia and locations

League table

Results

Top goalscorers
Last updated 13 May 2012

Top goalkeepers
Last updated 13 May 2012

Group 4
 Teams from Andalusia, Castile-La Mancha, Ceuta, Extremadura, Melilla and Murcia.

Summary before 2011–12 season 
 Playoffs de Ascenso:
 Real Murcia (P)
 Sevilla Atlético
 UD Melilla
 Cádiz CF

 Promoted to This Group From Tercera División:
 CF Villanovense
 Real Balompédica Linense
 Sporting Villanueva Promesas

 Relegated to This Group From Segunda División:
 None

 Relegated to Tercera División:
 CD Alcalá
 Unión Estepona CF
 Yeclano Deportivo
 Jumilla CF

Stadia and locations

League table

Results

Top goalscorers
Last updated 13 May 2012

Top goalkeepers
Last updated 13 May 2012

See also
 2011–12 Segunda División
 2012 Segunda División B play-offs
 2011–12 Tercera División
 2011–12 Copa del Rey

External links
Royal Spanish Football Federation

 
2011-12
3
Spa